Fritillaria przewalskii is a Chinese flowering plant species in the lily family Liliaceae. It is found only in China, in the Provinces of Gansu, Qinghai and Sichuan.

It produces bulbs up to 15 mm in diameter. The stem is up to 50 cm tall, with pendent, nodding flowers which are yellow with deep purple spots.

The species is named for Polish-Russian explorer Colonel Nikolai Przhevalsky, 1839–1888.

formerly included
Fritillaria przewalskii var. longistigma Y.K.Yang & J.K.Wu, now called Fritillaria sichuanica S.C.Chen

References

przewalskii
Endemic flora of China
Plants described in 1882